Peurise Teumaga or Peurise Lembaga is a shield originating from Aceh, Indonesia. This shield is very identical to the Peurise Awe, except that it is made of brass instead of rattan. The shield was also used by Acehnese warriors during the Aceh War against the Dutch colonials in the 19th century.

Description 
The Peurise Teumaga is made of cast brass or bronze. The decoration often consists of concentric circles made on a lathe using a chisel. Common decorations of six hexagonal stars can also be found on this shield. A rope is attached behind the shield to function as the handle. The diameter of this shield is approximately 24 to 35 centimeters.

See also

Baluse
Salawaku

References 

Shields
Weapons of Indonesia